Mark B. Templeton is an American businessman. He served as the President and CEO of Citrix Systems, Inc. from 2001 to 2015.

Early life and education
Templeton attended North Carolina State University, where he joined Lambda Chi Alpha fraternity. He has an MBA from the University of Virginia Darden School of Business.

Career
Templeton joined Citrix in 1995 as vice president of marketing, prior to the company's initial public offering. He was appointed president in 1998 and chief executive officer in 2001. Templeton left Citrix in 2015. By that time, the company's annual revenue had grown to $3.2 billion.

In his visit to Citrix SaaS division offices in February 2014, Templeton declared his highest aspiration was to be a moral corporate leader, and he received a standing ovation. Two weeks later the branch cut its workforce by 10%.

In 2008, Templeton joined the board of directors of Equifax. He retired from the board in November 2018.

On July 1, 2018 Templeton joined DigitalOcean as CEO replacing co-founder Ben Uretsky. On May 8, 2019, DigitalOcean  announced that Mark Templeton was stepping back from his role as CEO due to a personal health issue.

Political activity
Templeton contributed the maximum allowed by law to Jeb Bush's 2016 Presidential Campaign. In the past he has contributed to the Republican National Committee, John McCain, Hillary Clinton, Tim Mahoney, and Ron Klein.

References

External links
Company page

American computer businesspeople
American technology chief executives
Businesspeople in software
Living people
North Carolina State University alumni
University of Virginia Darden School of Business alumni
Equifax people
Year of birth missing (living people)
21st-century American businesspeople